Enrico Bombieri (born 26 November 1940) is an Italian mathematician, known for his work in analytic number theory, Diophantine geometry, complex analysis, and group theory. Bombieri is currently Professor Emeritus in the School of Mathematics at the Institute for Advanced Study in Princeton, New Jersey.
Bombieri won the Fields Medal in 1974 for his contributions to large sieve mathematics, conceptualized by Linnick 1941, and its application to the distribution of prime numbers.

Career
Bombieri published his first mathematical paper in 1957 when he was 16 years old. In 1963 at age 22 he earned his first degree (Laurea) in mathematics from the Università degli Studi di Milano under the supervision of Giovanni Ricci and then studied at Trinity College, Cambridge with Harold Davenport.

Bombieri was an assistant professor (1963–1965) and then a full professor (1965–1966) at the Università di Cagliari, at the Università di Pisa in 1966–1974, and then at the Scuola Normale Superiore di Pisa in 1974–1977. From Pisa he emigrated in 1977 to the United States, where he became a professor at the School of Mathematics at the Institute for Advanced Study in Princeton, New Jersey. In 2011 he became professor emeritus.

Bombieri is also known for his pro bono service on behalf of the mathematics profession, e.g. for serving on external review boards and for peer-reviewing extraordinarily complicated manuscripts (like the paper of Per Enflo on the invariant subspace problem).

Research
The Bombieri–Vinogradov theorem is one of the major applications of the large sieve method. It improves Dirichlet's theorem on prime numbers in arithmetic progressions, by showing that by averaging over the modulus over a range, the mean error is much less than can be proved in a given case. This result can sometimes substitute for the still-unproved generalized Riemann hypothesis.

In 1969 Bombieri, De Giorgi, and Giusti solved Bernstein's problem.

In 1976, Bombieri developed the technique known as the "asymptotic sieve". In 1980 he supplied the completion of the proof of the uniqueness of finite groups of Ree type in characteristic 3; at the time of its publication it was one of the missing steps in the classification of finite simple groups.

Awards
Bombieri's research in number theory, algebraic geometry, and mathematical analysis have earned him many international prizes — a Fields Medal in 1974 and the Balzan Prize in 1980. He was a plenary speaker at the International Congress of Mathematicians in 1974 at Vancouver. He is a member, or foreign member, of several learned academies, including the Accademia Nazionale dei Lincei (elected 1976), the French Academy of Sciences (elected 1984), and the United States National Academy of Sciences (elected 1996).
In 2002 he was made Cavaliere di Gran Croce al Merito della Repubblica Italiana. In 2010 he received the King Faisal International Prize (jointly with Terence Tao). and in 2020 he was awarded the Crafoord Prize in Mathematics.

Other interests
Bombieri, accomplished also in the arts, explored for wild orchids and other plants as a hobby in the Alps when a young man.

Selected publications

Sole
 E. Bombieri, Le Grand Crible dans la Théorie Analytique des Nombres (Seconde Édition). Astérisque 18, Paris 1987.

Joint

 B. Beauzamy, E. Bombieri, P. Enflo and H. L. Montgomery. "Product of polynomials in many variables", Journal of Number Theory, pages 219–245, 1990.

See also
Bombieri norm
Bombieri–Vinogradov theorem
Glossary of arithmetic and Diophantine geometry – Bombieri–Lang conjecture

References

Sources

 E. Bombieri, Le Grand Crible dans la Théorie Analytique des Nombres (Seconde Édition). Astérisque 18, Paris 1987.
 B. Beauzamy, E. Bombieri, P. Enflo and H. L. Montgomery. "Product of polynomials in many variables", Journal of Number Theory, pages 219–245, 1990.

External links

Enrico Bombieri, Institute for Advanced Study
Lista delle pubblicazioni di Enrico Bombieri, University of Pisa

20th-century Italian mathematicians
21st-century Italian mathematicians
1940 births
Fields Medalists
Institute for Advanced Study faculty
Living people
Members of the French Academy of Sciences
Members of the United States National Academy of Sciences
Number theorists
PDE theorists
Scientists from Milan
University of Milan alumni
Members of the Royal Swedish Academy of Sciences